Artem Vladimirovich Kontsevoy (born 20 May 1983) is a former football forward from Belarus. He was a member of the Belarus national team. His younger brother Sergey Konsevoy is also a professional footballer.

Honors and awards
BATE Borisov
Belarusian Premier League champion: 2002, 2010, 2011, 2012, 2013
Belarusian Cup winner: 2009–10
Belarusian Super Cup winner: 2010, 2013

Spartak Moscow
Russian Cup winner: 2002–03

MTZ-RIPO Minsk
Belarusian Cup winner: 2004–05, 2007–08

External links
 
 

1983 births
Living people
Sportspeople from Gomel
Belarusian footballers
Belarus international footballers
Belarusian expatriate footballers
FC BATE Borisov players
FC Spartak Moscow players
FC Partizan Minsk players
FC Chernomorets Novorossiysk players
PFC Spartak Nalchik players
Association football forwards
Belarusian Premier League players
Russian Premier League players
Expatriate footballers in Russia
FC Torpedo-BelAZ Zhodino players
FC RUOR Minsk players
FC Neman Grodno players